Daniel William Heep (born July 3, 1957), is a retired Major League Baseball outfielder.

Heep, who batted and threw left-handed, played for five different ballclubs during his 13-year career: the Houston Astros (1979–1982), New York Mets (1983–1986), Los Angeles Dodgers (1987–1988), Boston Red Sox (1989–1990), and Atlanta Braves (1991).

Heep played for two different World Series champions: the New York Mets in 1986, and the Los Angeles Dodgers in 1988.

Baseball career
Heep played baseball for, and graduated from, Lee High School in San Antonio.

Heep played for St. Mary's University in San Antonio where he was twice an All-American, in 1976 and 1978, as a pitcher. At St. Mary's he earned his bachelor's degree in physical education, and he is a member of that school's Athletic Hall of Fame.

Originally drafted by the Houston Astros in the 1979 Major League Baseball Draft, he compiled a .331 batting average, 23 home runs and 108 runs batted in (RBI) in a little over a year in the minors to earn his first major league call up. His major league debut came on August 31,  against the New York Mets. He remained with the Astros through the end of the season, achieving a .143 average with two runs batted in. The second RBI was a game winner against the Los Angeles Dodgers on September 30. He was the Pacific Coast League batting champion with a .343 average with the Tucson Toros in 1980.

After hitting .237 with four home runs and 22 RBI in 85 games with the Astros in 1982, he was acquired by the New York Mets for Mike Scott at the Winter Meetings on December 10.

Danny Heep was the 4000th strikeout victim of Nolan Ryan on July 11, 1985.

NCAA coach
Heep was the head coach for the NCAA Incarnate Word Cardinals baseball team in San Antonio from 1998-2017. Since becoming head coach in 1998, the program has won two conference championships. In 2014, they became a Division I program in the Southland Conference.

Head coaching record
Below is a table of Heep's yearly records as a collegiate head baseball coach.

Personal
His uncle was former major league catcher Matt Batts, who played for the Boston Red Sox, St. Louis Browns, Detroit Tigers, Chicago White Sox and Cincinnati Redlegs between 1947 and 1956.

References

Article – from University of the Incarnate Word's official website.
Interview with Danny on Blog Talk Radio. 
New York Times Article on Heep's collision with Terry Blocker.

External links

1957 births
Living people
American expatriate baseball players in Canada
Atlanta Braves players
Baseball players from San Antonio
Boston Red Sox players
Columbus Astros players
Daytona Beach Astros players
Houston Astros players
Incarnate Word Cardinals baseball coaches
Los Angeles Dodgers players
Major League Baseball outfielders
New York Mets players
San Antonio Dodgers players
St. Mary's Rattlers baseball players
Tucson Toros players
Vancouver Canadians players